The Night the Memories Shine Bright is a South Korean show distributed by MBC Drama. The show was aired every Thursday at 23:05.

Format 
Middle of the star guests on the theme of memories and stories to share with the talk show program.

Performer 
 Host
 Ryu Si-won (EP 1-21)
 Kyeong-shil Lee (EP 1-21)
 Kim Hee-chul (EP 1-5, 8-16, 18-21)
 Lee Hongryul (EP 3-6, 6-21)
 Special
 Yoon Jung-soo (EP 1-7, 9)
 Hwi-soon Park (EP 1-2)
 Noh Hong-chul, Han Sun-hwa, Hyang-gi Jo (EP 1)
 Hong Seo-beom (EP 1-10)
 Yoon Bo-ra (EP 2)
 Han Groo (EP 6)
 Joo Young-hoon (EP 6-7)
 Lee Kye-in (EP 2, 6-7, 9, 16-17)
 Chun Myung-hoon (EP 12-13)

List of episodes

Rating 

In the ratings below, the highest rating for the show will be in red, and the lowest rating for the show will be in blue.

References

2011 South Korean television series debuts
Korean-language television shows
South Korean variety television shows
2011 South Korean television series endings